Turner Hills is a group of hills between Astro Glacier and Nimrod Glacier in the northwest part of the Miller Range. Mapped by the United States Geological Survey (USGS) from tellurometer surveys and Navy air photos, 1960–62. Named by Advisory Committee on Antarctic Names (US-ACAN) for Dr. Mort D. Turner of the National Science Foundation who has been Program Manager for Polar Earth Sciences, Division of Polar Programs, since 1959. Turner studied the geology of the dry valley areas near McMurdo Sound, 1959–60, and in several subsequent seasons served as United States Antarctic Research Program (USARP) Representative in Antarctica.

Hills of Oates Land